Slávka Budínová (21 April 1924 – 31 July 2002) was a Czechoslovak film actress. She appeared in over 60 films and television shows between 1953 and 1999.

Selected filmography
 The Flood (1958)
 Lidé z maringotek (1966)
 The Tricky Game of Love (1971)
 Svět otevřený náhodám (1971)
 Noc na Karlštejně (1973)
 Hroch (1973)
 My Brother Has a Cute Brother (1975)
 Tomorrow I'll Wake Up and Scald Myself with Tea (1977)

References

External links
 

1924 births
2002 deaths
Czech film actresses
Actors from Ostrava
Czech television actresses
20th-century Czech actresses